Colognathus is a genus of extinct reptile from Late Triassic rocks of the southwestern United States.  It was described in 1928 from a jaw fragment by Case, who interpreted the new taxon as a fish.  The type species is C. obscurus.

Distribution
Approximately 25 specimens have been found as of 2007. A great many of the reptile's fossils are from the Tecovas Formation of western Texas. Other finds of Colognathus were from places such as the Palo Duro Canyon (in western Texas) and the Santa Rosa Formation (in New Mexico). One tooth is known from the Blue Mesa Member of the Chinle Formation at Petrified Forest National Park, Arizona. Material from the Middle Triassic (Ladinian) Lower Keuper of southern Germany has been assigned to Colognathus, extending the temporal range of the form in the Middle Triassic.

Classification
Colognathus was originally named Xenognathus by Ermine Cowles Case in 1928, but that name was preoccupied, so Case provided the replacement name Colognathus in 1933. Researchers have classified Colognathus as a reptile, although its lower-level classification remains uncertain, although it may be a procolophinid.

References

Late Triassic reptiles of North America
Middle Triassic reptiles of Europe
Fossil taxa described in 1933
Taxa named by Ermine Cowles Case